John Frank Lelivelt (November 14, 1885 – January 20, 1941) was an American outfielder who played for the Washington Senators, New York Highlanders / Yankees and Cleveland Naps.

Playing career

Early years
Lelivelt was born as Johannes Franciscus Lelivelt in Amsterdam, The Netherlands, on 14 November 1885. His father was Franciscus Zacharias Lelivelt (later Frank) from Groessen, his mother was Theodra Mattijssen (later Dora) from Renkum. They married in Amsterdam on 19 June 1884, and emigrated to the US in 1887. He saw his most playing time during his years in Washington. However, his batting average would increase after he left the Senators.

Record hitting streak
Lelivelt started the 1912 season with the Rochester Hustlers. The Hustlers had won pennants each of the three previous years. After his record hitting streak, the first-place Hustlers sold Lelivelt and Tommy McMillen to the New York Highlanders. Lelivelt had a .351 batting average with 33 doubles for the Hustlers. The Toronto Maple Leafs passed the Hustlers in the standings. The city of Rochester would not have another International League champion until 1928. The record hitting streak was lost to history until the 2007 version of the International League Record Book recognized the hitting streak.

Later years
Lelivelt played from 1912 until 1914 as a part-time player. Despite having a .301 career major league average, he never was a full-time player. In 1914, several Naps players split time between the Cleveland Naps and the American Association Cleveland Bearcats in an effort to prevent the Federal League from moving a team to Cleveland. Lelivelt was one of those players. He would play in the minor leagues until retiring as a player in 1925.

Managerial career and death
Lelivelt became a player-manager for the Western League's Omaha franchise in 1920. From 1929 through 1937, he managed the Los Angeles Angels (PCL), including the 1934 team that won 137 out of 187 games (.733) and is hailed as one of the minor league's "greatest teams".  When Emile Sick purchased the Seattle Rainiers, one of his first projects was bringing Lelivelt to Seattle.  His Seattle Rainiers teams won Pacific Coast League titles in 1939 and 1940. Except for 1937, he managed every year until his death from a heart attack in January 1941 at the age of 55. He was interred in Glendale, California's Grand View Memorial Park Cemetery.

In 1943, Lelivelt was posthumously elected to the Pacific Coast League Hall of Fame.

References

External links

1885 births
1941 deaths
Baseball players from Chicago
Cleveland Bearcats players
Cleveland Naps players
Hartford Senators players
Kansas City Blues (baseball) players
Lake Linden Sandy Cities players
Los Angeles Angels (minor league) managers
Los Angeles Angels (minor league) players
Louisville Colonels (minor league) players
Major League Baseball outfielders
Milwaukee Brewers (minor league) managers
Minneapolis Millers (baseball) players
New York Highlanders players
New York Yankees players
Omaha Buffaloes players
Omaha Rourkes players
Reading Pretzels players
Rochester Hustlers players
St. Joseph Saints players
Sportspeople from Chicago
Tulsa Oilers (baseball) players
Washington Senators (1901–1960) players
Burials at Grand View Memorial Park Cemetery
Dutch emigrants to the United States